The Socialist Party of Serbia (SPS) is a political party in Serbia. It is led by Ivica Dačić. 

It was founded in 1990 as a merger of the League of Communists of Serbia and Socialist Alliance of Working People of Yugoslavia with Slobodan Milošević as its first president. In the 1990 general elections, SPS won 194 out of 250 seats in the National Assembly while Milošević was elected president of Serbia. The following year, mass protests were organised in Belgrade, while Milošević stepped down as president of SPS; he returned as president in 1992. After the break-up of Yugoslavia in 1992, Serbia became a part of Federal Republic of Yugoslavia, and SPS contested in its first parliamentary election which was boycotted by the opposition. Simultaneously, general elections were organised in Serbia; SPS won 101 seats while Milošević remained president. After this election, SPS relied on the far-right Serbian Radical Party (SRS) until the 1993 election; the coalition between SPS and SRS was disintegrated, and SPS instead formed a coalition government with the New Democracy (ND). This coalition was later expanded in 1996, when the Yugoslav Left (JUL) joined to form the Left Coalition. ND abandoned the coalition after SPS and JUL formed a government with SRS in 1998, which was then defeated by the Democratic Opposition of Serbia (DOS) in the 2000 general election. The results of the election, which were contested by DOS, led to mass protests, which then culminated into the overthrow of Slobodan Milošević. 

SPS remained in opposition until 2003, when it began serving as confidence and supply to the government led by Vojislav Koštunica to 2007. Dačić, who was elected president of SPS in 2006, led the party into a coalition government with the Democratic Party after the 2008 parliamentary election, while four years later he became the prime minister of Serbia after he formed a coalition government with the Serbian Progressive Party (SNS). He remained prime minister until 2014, while SPS has since then remained a junior member of SNS-led governments. SPS is affiliated with United Serbia and Greens of Serbia political parties. Under Milošević's leadership, SPS supported mixed economy and promoted nationalism, while it also maintained connections with trade unions. After Dačić became president, SPS remained affiliated with populism, but moved towards social democracy and shifted from Euroscepticism to a more pro-European image which has been described as pragmatic.

History

Formation 
After the World War II, the Communist Party consolidated power in Yugoslavia. Each constituent republic had its own branch of the party, with Serbia having the Communist Party of Serbia, which was renamed to League of Communists of Serbia (SKS) in 1952. SKS elected Slobodan Milošević as its president in 1986, after an endorsement coming from then-incumbent president of SKS, Ivan Stambolić. Milošević came to power by promising to reduce the autonomy of provinces of Kosovo and Vojvodina. At a congress that was held in January 1990, rifts between SKS and League of Communists of Slovenia occurred which ultimately led to the dissolution of the federal Communist Party. This also led to the establishment of multi-party systems in the constituent republics. 

Milošević organised a congress on 17 July 1990, during which its delegates voted in favour of merging SKS and the Socialist Alliance of Working People of Yugoslavia (SSRNJ) to create the Socialist Party of Serbia (SPS). Milošević was elected as the party's president. According to political scientist Jerzy Wiatr, the merger "did not substantially change either the organisational structure of the party or its administration", although SPS did gain control of a large amount of infrastructure, including material and financial assets. Milošević as president of the SPS was able to wield considerable power and influence in the government and the public and private sectors, while members of SPS who had shown their independence from loyalty towards Milošević were expelled from the party.

1990–1992 

SPS took part in the general elections which was organised for December 1990. The parliamentary election was conducted in a first-past-the-post system, where members were elected in 250 single-member constituency seats; this system strengthened the position of SPS. This resulted into SPS winning 194 out of 250 seats in the National Assembly, despite only winning 48% of the popular vote. Opposition parties, such as the Democratic Party (DS) and Serbian Renewal Movement (SPO), tried to challenge the legitimacy of the election, citing alleged abuse of postal voting and manipulation during vote counting. In the presidential election, Milošević won 65% of the popular vote in the first round of the election. By January 1991, sociologist Laslo Sekelj reported that SPS had 500,000 members. SPS was faced with protests in March 1991, while Milošević was succeeded by Borisav Jović as the president of SPS on 24 May 1991; he held the position until 24 October 1992, when Milošević returned as president of SPS, following the second party congress.

After the break-up of Yugoslavia, Serbia became a part of Federal Republic of Yugoslavia. With the opposition boycotting the May 1992 parliamentary election, SPS won 49% of the popular vote. Protests were held shortly after the election, after which snap elections were called for December 1992, in which SPS won 33% of the popular vote. Simultaneously with these elections, the 1992 general elections occurred in Serbia as a result of a early elections referendum that was organised in October 1992. The parliamentary election in 1992 was conducted under a proportional representation system, and in it SPS won 101 out of 250 seats in the National Assembly; because of that the SPS minority government had to rely on the far-right Serbian Radical Party (SRS), which had won 73 seats. In the presidential election however, Milošević won 57% of the popular vote in the first round, while his opponent Milan Panić won 35% of the popular vote.

1993–2000 
After the announcement that SPS would abandon its hardline position regarding the Bosnian War and Croatian War of Independence in favour of a compromise and after a dispute regarding the rebalancing of the federal budget in July 1993, the coalition between SPS and SRS was disintegrated. SRS then unsuccessfully called a motion of no confidence against SPS in September 1993, though Milošević ended up dissolving the National Assembly to call a snap parliamentary election for December 1993. In the parliamentary election, SPS won 123 seats, though still short 3 seats of a majority, Milošević then persuaded the New Democracy (ND), which as part of the SPO-led Democratic Movement of Serbia coalition won 5 seats, to enter a coalition government with SPS. ND accepted this and the new government headed by Mirko Marjanović was sworn in March 1994.

SPS soon formed the Left Coalition with ND and the Yugoslav Left (JUL), a far-left political party headed by Milošević's wife Mirjana Marković, to contest the parliamentary elections for the federal parliament in November 1996. The Left Coalition emerged with 64 out of 108 seats in the election. Milošević, who was constitutionally limited to two terms as president of Serbia, was elected president of Federal Republic of Yugoslavia in July 1997, shortly before the general elections in Serbia. SPS took part with ND and JUL under the Left Coalition banner and won 110 seats in the National Assembly. ND declined to join the government and the coalition was subsequently disintegrated after SPS and JUL formed a government with SRS. In the presidential election, SPS nominated Zoran Lilić, although the election ended up being annulled as the election's turnout was less than 50%. This led to another presidential election which was held in December 1997; Milan Milutinović, the SPS-nominated candidate, won in the second round of the election.

The new SPS-led government was faced with the Kosovo War which ended up making a major impact on SPS. SPO joined the SPS-led federal government in January 1999. Vuk Drašković, the leader of SPO, supported the proposed Rambouillet Agreement, though Milošević declined to sign it, which ultimately led to the NATO bombing of Yugoslavia. Additionally, SPS and SPO entered into a conflict after the assassination of journalist Slavko Ćuruvija, which led to dismissal of SPO from the federal government. In the same year, Milošević proposed constitutional changes to the federal parliament to allow him to run for another term in the 2000 election; the amendments were passed by the parliament. Otpor, a student resistance movement formed in October 1998, and the Democratic Opposition of Serbia (DOS), a wide alliance of opposition parties formed in January 2000, called for early elections, though the elections ended up being organised for September 2000. Milošević faced Vojislav Koštunica, the DOS-nominated candidate, in the presidential election. The Federal Election Committee reported that Milošević placed second although that Koštunica also won less than 50% of the popular vote; this resulted into DOS-organised mass protests, which culminated into the overthrow of Slobodan Milošević. Milošević accepted defeat on 5 October 2000, while the Federal Election Committee published actual results on 7 October. Shortly after the elections, SPS, SPO, and DOS agreed to organise a snap parliamentary election in Serbia in December 2000. This parliamentary election, and all subsequent ones, were conducted in a proportional electoral system with only one electoral unit. SPS suffered defeat and only won 37 out of 250 seats in the National Assembly, which put the party in opposition for the first time since its formation in 1990.

2001–2008 

Milošević, who was still the president of SPS, was arrested in March 2001 on suspicion of corruption and abuse of power, and was shortly after extradited to the International Criminal Tribunal for the former Yugoslavia to stand trial for war crimes instead. At the presidential election in September 2002, SPS nominated actor Bata Živojinović; he placed sixth. This election ended up being annulled as the turnout in the second round was less than 50%. This resulted into another presidential election which was held in December 2002; SPS supported Vojislav Šešelj, the leader of SRS. He placed second in the presidential election, which ended up being annulled again as the turnout was less than 50%. At a party congress in January 2003, Ivica Dačić, a reformist within SPS, was elected president of the party's main board. It was reported that Milošević subsequently demanded his exclusion of the party, although Dačić denied this. Another presidential election was held in November 2003 which SPS ended up boycotting. A month later, SPS took part in a snap parliamentary election in which it won 22 seats; the drop in popularity occurred due to their voters shifting towards SRS. SPS ended up serving as confidence and supply to Koštunica's government in the National Assembly. In 2004, the 50% turnout rule for presidential elections was abolished, after which SPS nominated Dačić as their presidential candidate for the 2004 presidential election; he placed fifth.

After the death of Milošević in March 2006, a conflict between Dačić and Milorad Vučelić emerged regarding who would continue leading the party. At the party congress in December 2006, Dačić was officially elected president of SPS, after previously serving as the party's de facto leader since 2003. In the parliamentary election that was held in January 2007, SPS dropped to 16 seats in the National Assembly, after which SPS returned to opposition. A year later, SPS nominated Milutin Mrkonjić, the party's deputy president, as its candidate in the presidential election. Mrkonjić campaigned on social issues and issues regarding the economy, insisting that SPS is "the true party of the left" and that Serbia should join the European Union. He placed fourth, winning 6% of the popular vote. SPS shortly after formed a coalition with United Serbia (JS) and Party of United Pensioners of Serbia (PUPS) which took part in the snap parliamentary election in May 2008. The coalition won 20 seats, 12 of which went to SPS alone. Initially, SPS negotiated with SRS, Democratic Party of Serbia, and New Serbia to form a government, however SPS ended up abandoning those negotiations in favour of those with the For a European Serbia coalition, which was led by DS. The DS–SPS coalition government was sworn in July 2008, with Dačić serving as first deputy prime minister while Slavica Đukić Dejanović became the president of the National Assembly.

2009–2014 

While in government, SPS was faced with challenges regarding the Kosovo declaration of independence and the global financial crisis, which led to low rates of economic growth. Additionally, SPS signed a reconciliation agreement with its government partner DS, although clashes between the parties had continued to occur even after the agreement. Further, protests that were organised in 2011 led Boris Tadić, the president of Serbia, to call snap elections for 2012. During the 2012 campaign period, SPS campaigned with JS and PUPS, with Dačić being their joint presidential candidate. He campaigned on workers' rights, free education, and ending neoliberalism, as well as rising wages and pensions, while SPS also campaigned on criticising post-Milošević governments. In the parliamentary election, the coalition led by SPS won 44 seats in the National Assembly, while SPS alone won 25. Dačić placed third in the presidential election, winning 15% of the popular vote. After the announcement that Tomislav Nikolić, the leader of the Serbian Progressive Party (SNS), had won the presidential election, Dačić abandoned the coalition with DS and pursued to form a government with SNS instead. This resulted into Dačić becoming the prime minister of Serbia in July 2012.

As prime minister, Dačić worked on normalisation between Serbia and Kosovo, which was formalised under the Brussels Agreement in April 2013. His government was re-shuffled on his order in September 2013, after which SPS and SNS continued to govern alone without the United Regions of Serbia. However, president Nikolić called for snap parliamentary elections to be held in March 2014. SPS took part in the election with JS and PUPS and campaigned on the protection of workers, peasants, and pensioners. They won 44 seats in the National Assembly, while their coalition partner, SNS, won 158 seats in total. SPS remained in government, although Dačić was succeeded by Aleksandar Vučić, the leader of SNS, as prime minister of Serbia. At a party congress in December 2014, SPS adopted its new logo.

2015–present 
Throughout of 2015, it was discussed whether a snap parliamentary election would occur. This was confirmed in January 2016, when a parliamentary election was announced to be held in April 2016. Following the announcement, PUPS left the SPS–JS coalition and joined the one that was led by SNS, while SPS and JS formalised a coalition with the Greens of Serbia (ZS). The SPS-led ballot list also included Joška Broz, the leader of the Communist Party and the grandson of Josip Broz Tito. This coalition won 29 seats in the National Assembly, 21 out of which were occupied by SPS. Following the election, SPS agreed to again serve as a junior member in the SNS-led coalition government, which was inaugurated in August 2016. SPS did not take part in the 2017 presidential election and instead it supported Vučić, who ended up winning 56% of the popular vote in the first round of the election. His election as president was followed by mass protests.

At the end of 2018, a series of anti-government protests began and they lasted until March 2020. During this period, the opposition Alliance for Serbia announced that it would boycott the 2020 parliamentary elections. This led the SPS-led coalition to win 32 seats, despite getting less votes than in the 2016 election. SPS offered to continue its cooperation with the SNS-led coalition, which now had 188 out of 250 seats in the National Assembly. SPS remained in government with SNS after the election, while Dačić, who had been the first deputy prime minister of Serbia since 2014, became the president of the National Assembly in October 2020. Dačić presided over the dialogues to improve election conditions from May to October 2021. SPS affirmed its position to continue its support for SNS after these dialogues, while in January 2022, SPS announced that it would support Vučić in the 2022 presidential election. In the parliamentary election, SPS took part in a coalition with JS and ZS, while it campaigned on greater cooperation with China and Russia. It won 31 seats in total, 22 out of which went to SPS, while Vučić won 60% of the popular vote in the presidential election. SPS agreed to continue governing with SNS after the election, which led to Dačić being re-appointed as first deputy prime minister in October 2022.

Ideology and platform

Milošević era 
SPS adopted its first political programme in October 1990, which had the intention to develop "Serbia as a socialist republic, founded on law and social justice". The party made economic reforms outside of Marxist ideology such as recognising all forms of property and intended a progression to a market economy while at the same time advocating some regulation for the purposes of "solidarity, equality, and social security". While in power, SPS enacted policies that were negative towards workers' rights, while beginning in 1992, SPS moved its support towards a mixed economy with both public and private sectors. SPS maintained connections with trade unions, although independent trade unions faced hostility and their activities were brutalised by the police. During Milošević's era, SPS was positioned on the left-wing on the political spectrum, and was associated with anti-liberalism. SPS declared itself to be a "democratic socialist party" and "the follower of the ideas of Svetozar Marković, Dimitrije Tucović, and the Serbian Social Democratic Party". Heinz Timmermann, a political scientist, and Marko Stojić, a Metropolitan University Prague lecturer, associated SPS during Milošević's era with nationalist form of populism. Political scientist Jean-Pierre Cabestan noted that SPS thrived on the growth of nationalism, but was not nationalist itself, and instead associated SPS with communism. Mirjana Prošić-Dvornić, an ethnologist, noted that SPS "usurped the nationalist rhetoric of opposition parties". Janusz Bugajski, a political scientist, described SPS as nationalist, but also noted that it never identified as such. Warren Zimmermann, the last United States ambassador to Yugoslavia, argued that Milošević was "not a genuine nationalist but an opportunist".

SPS nominally endorsed the principle of full equality of all the Yugoslav peoples and ethnic minorities, while it was also supportive of Yugoslavism. Up until 1993, it supported Serbs in Bosnia and Herzegovina, and Croatia who wished to remain in Yugoslavia. As Croatia and Bosnia and Herzegovina declared independence, the involvement by SPS as a ruling party had become more devoted to helping external Serbs run their own independent entities. Milošević denied that the government of Serbia helped Serb military forces in Bosnia and Herzegovina, instead stating that they had the right to self-determination; Jović stated in a 1995 BBC documentary that Milošević endorsed the transfer of Bosnian Serb federal army forces to the Bosnian Serb Army in 1992 to help achieve Serb independence from Bosnia and Herzegovina. Though shortly before the Dayton Agreement in 1995, SPS began to oppose the government of Republika Srpska, which was headed by Radovan Karadžić. The opposition accused SPS of authoritarianism, as well as personal profiteering from illegal business transactions in the arms trade, cigarettes and oil; this illegal business was caused by the UN sanctions, and none of accusations for personal profiteering were ever proven at the court. Political scientists Nebojša Vladisavljević, Karmen Erjavec, and Florian Bieber also described Milošević's rule as authoritarian. Independent media during the SPS administration received threats and high fines.

Dačić era 
After Dačić came to power, SPS shifted towards democratic socialism, and then to social democracy in the 2010s. Although SPS is still affiliated and has promoted populist rhetoric, its nationalist image has been softened. It is now positioned on the centre-left on the political spectrum. Prior to mid-2000s, SPS was Eurosceptic while it also promoted anti-globalist and anti-Western sentiment. It also promoted "anti-imperialist" criticism towards the European Union and NATO. Since then, SPS had adopted its support for the accession of Serbia to the European Union, and a more pro-European image after it came back to government in 2008, which scholars Nataša Jovanović Ajzenhamer and Haris Dajč rather described as pragmatic. Although, SPS has also been also described as pro-Russian.

Organisation 
The current president of SPS is Dačić, who was most recently re-elected in December 2022, while the current vice-presidents are Aleksandar Antić, Branko Ružić, Dušan Bajatović, Novica Tončev, Slavica Đukić Dejanović, Đorđe Milićević, and Žarko Obradović. The president of its parliamentary group is Snežana Paunović. The headquarters of SPS are located at Bulevar Mihajla Pupina 6 in Belgrade. It has a youth wing named Socialist Youth and a women's wing named Women's Forum.

Its membership from its foundation in 1990 to 1997 involved many elements of the social strata of Serbia, including state administrators and business management elites of state-owned enterprises, employees in the state-owned sector, less privileged groups of farmers, and the unemployed and pensioners. From 1998 to 2000, its membership included apparatchiks at administrative and judicial levels, the nouveau riche, whose business success was founded solely from their affiliation with the government, and top army and police officials and a large majority of the police force. In 2011, SPS reported to have had 120,000 members, while in 2014 SPS stated that they had around 200,000 members. SPS reported to have 65,000 members in 2015.

International cooperation 
SPS cooperated with Momir Bulatović in Montenegro and the parties he led, while in Bosnia and Herzegovina SPS used to cooperate with Karadžić's Serb Democratic Party and with the Socialist Party. SPS cooperates with Syriza, a political party in Greece. Following the 2008 elections, SPS sent an application to join the Socialist International while Dačić also met with its then-president George Papandreou. However, the Social Democratic Party of Bosnia and Herzegovina opposed this move and called for its application to be declined, while Jelko Kacin, a Liberal Democracy of Slovenia politician, claimed that Tadić blocked SPS from joining the Socialist International. Its candidature has not yet been accepted, although SPS also seeks associate member status in the Party of European Socialists. In the Parliamentary Assembly of the Council of Europe, SPS is represented by Dunja Simonović Bratić, who sits in the Socialists, Democrats and Greens Group.

List of presidents

Electoral performance

Parliamentary elections

Presidential elections

Federal parliamentary elections

Federal presidential elections

References

External links 

 
 

Socialist Party of Serbia